Al Khail (formerly Nakheel) is a rapid transit station on the Red Line of the Dubai Metro in Dubai, UAE. It opened on 15 October 2010 along with four other intermediate stations on the Red Line, originally as "Nakheel". It was renamed to "Al Khail" on November 24, 2020.

Location
Al Khail station is located slightly under  to the southwest of Downtown Dubai, between Interchanges 4 and 5 of Sheikh Zayed Road. It is the closest stop on the Dubai Metro to the American University of Dubai and Dubai Media City to the west and the Emirates Golf Club to the east.

Station layout
Al Khail station rests on a viaduct paralleling the eastern side of Sheikh Zayed Road. It is categorised as a type 3 elevated station, as it has three tracks, the third being used to hold trains when necessary. The station has an elevated concourse, with pedestrian access aided by aerial walkways to either side of the road. Sidings to the east and west of the station can be accessed from the middle track and as such, trains on this station open on the left hand side, being the only station in the Red line where it does so.

References

Railway stations in the United Arab Emirates opened in 2010
Dubai Metro stations